Nothing's Gonna Stop Me Now may refer to:
 "Nothing's Gonna Stop Me Now" (Samantha Fox song), 1987
 "Nothing's Gonna Stop Me Now" (Perfect Strangers song), the theme song of Perfect Strangers, U.S. TV series, sung by David Pomeranz
 "Nothing's Gonna Stop Me Now", interlude from P. Diddy's album, The Saga Continues..., featuring Faith Evans and Mario Winans

See also 
 "Nothing's Gonna Stop Us Now", song by Starship from No Protection and the 1987 film Mannequin